Names are words or terms used for identification.

Names may also refer to:

 Names (EP), by Johnny Foreigner
 Names (journal), an academic journal of onomastics
 The Names (band), a Belgian post-punk band
 The Names (novel),  by Don DeLillo
 Names Hill, a bluff on the Green River in Wyoming, US
 "Names", a song by Cat Power from You Are Free

See also 
 The infernal names, biblical anti-figures in LaVeyan Satanism
 Name (disambiguation)